Brendan Odilo Howard (March 22, 1931 – March 20, 2000) was a politician in Newfoundland. He represented Bay de Verde in the Newfoundland House of Assembly from 1972 to 1975.

The son of Lawrence Peter Howard and Margaret Kehoe, he was born in Daniel's Cove and was educated there and in Carbonear. In 1953, Howard married Elizabeth McCann.

He ran unsuccessfully for a seat in the Newfoundland assembly in 1971 but was elected in 1972.

References 

1931 births
2000 deaths
Progressive Conservative Party of Newfoundland and Labrador MHAs